California coastal prairie, also known as northern coastal grassland, is a grassland plant community of California and Oregon in the temperate grasslands, savannas, and shrublands biome. It is found along the Pacific Coast, from as far south as Los Angeles in Southern California to southern Oregon.

Description
California's coastal prairies are the most species-rich grassland types in North America (Stromberg et al. 2002) with at most, 26 species present per square meter.  Coastal prairie is also the single most urbanized major vegetation type in the US; 24% of the habitat has been lost to pavement.

Wind, salt spray, fire, and grazing are evolutionary disturbances which affected shrubs and tree growth maintaining more open grasslands.  In the absence of grazing and/or fire, many areas of coastal prairie are being lost to shrub and tree encroachment.  The accumulated organic matter from centuries produce a rich, dark prairie soil (mollisol). Coastal prairie often forms a landscape mosaic with the Northern coastal scrub plant community.  Coastal prairies also often form coastal terraces which can occur without a major successional event such as fire or grazing.  These terraces are often used for human services such as agriculture and can be seen in areas such as Santa Cruz and San Luis Obispo.

Characteristic species
Characteristic species of this community include:
Perennial bunch grasses:
Bromus carinatus
Calamagrostis foliosa
Danthonia californica
Deschampsia cespitosa
Festuca californica
Festuca elmeri
Festuca idahoensis
Hordeum brachyantherum
Nassella pulchra

Other plants 
Bracken fern - Pteridium aquilinum 
Douglas iris - Iris douglasiana 
Blue dicks - Dipterostemon capitatus 
Blue-eyed grass - Sisyrinchium bellum
Dwarf Owl's Clovers - Triphysaria pusilla

Endangered species
Many of the rarest plant species in the coastal prairie exist mainly on land currently being grazed by livestock. These species have been disappearing when land is set aside for conservation and the livestock are removed. The entire coastal prairie biome can be completely restored, even after the plants seem to have disappeared for decades after grazing end, by unearthing their dormant native seeds in the soil, that are still viable underneath the weeds. Between 1992 and 2000, at 300 Byers Lane, La Selva Beach in Santa Cruz County, 70 acres of habitat went from 99% weed-covered to 95% native covered in only eight years, without sowing any seeds.

Rare and endangered species found in the coastal prairie include:
Flora
Santa Cruz tarweed - Holocarpha macradenia — found in limited locations
San Francisco popcornflower - Plagiobothrys diffusus
Robust spineflower - Chorizanthe robusta robusta
Artist's popcornflower - Plagiobothrys chorisianus
Pt. Reyes meadowfoam - Limnanthes sp.
Santa Cruz clover  - Trifolium buckwestiorum
Indian clover - Trifolium amoenum
Gray's clover - Trifolium grayi
San Francisco owl's clover - Triphysaria floribunda. 
Fauna  
Ohlone tiger beetle - Cicindela ohlone — endemic to Santa Cruz County
San Francisco garter snake - Thamnophis sirtalis tetrataenia

Endangered habitat

Unlike many other Mediterranean climate grasslands, the mostly perennial bunch grasses stay green all summer, which makes the coastal prairies attractive for grazing cattle and sheep. Other effects to this plant community include agriculture and development. California's coastal prairie, like most other California grasslands, has been greatly affected by the invasion of non-native species, including earthworms, snails, slugs, pill bugs, earwigs, and annual Mediterranean grasses.

Most recently, invasive perennial grasses are the greatest threat.  These include velvet grass (Holcus lanatus), tall fescue (Festuca arundinacea), and Harding grass (Phalaris aquatica); the impact of these species can be somewhat ameliorated by well-planned livestock grazing, which can reduce these species' cover and allow native species to persist. Woody species also pose an invasion threat. These include Hypericum perforatum, gorse, and broom.

California's coastal prairies are protected by the California Coastal Act, which considers these habitat types to be Environmentally Sensitive Habitat Areas (ESHA). Akin to the endangered species act for habitat types on California's coast, ESHA protections disallow any harm to so designated habitats, except where such harm is necessary to otherwise restore the habitat as a whole (e.g., prescribed fire, grazing).

Coastal Prairies of California are classified as critically endangered with the following stressors causing the most impacts: invasive species, low nutrient soils, urbanization, and unregulated recreational activities. There are also a number of abiotic factors which make this environment extremely hard to tolerate from a plant’s perspective such as constant sun exposure, high salt deposits, strong winds, and abrasion damage or complete submersion from sandy dunes or beaches. Both impacts of high winds and salinity are damaging to plants, acting as an accelerated corrosive agent to those who are especially not fit or adapted for such conditions. Historically, applications for sand stabilization resulted in positive feedbacks within the system, thus spurring an optimal habitat for invasive species to flourish.

See also
Año Nuevo State Park
Gray Whale Cove State Beach
Point Lobos State Natural Reserve
Sonoma Coast State Park
Native grasses of California
Grasslands of California
Bunch grass
Invasive grasses of North America
Invasive species

References

Bibliography 

 Dremann, C., with M. Shaw. 2002. An Innovative Approach to Restoring a Coastal California Ecosystem. Ecological Restoration 20(2):103-107. 
 Ford, L. D., and G. F. Hayes. 2007. Northern coastal scrub and coastal prairie. in M. G. Barbour, T. Keeler-Wolf, and A. A. Schoenherr, editors. Terrestrial vegetation of California. University of California Press., Berkeley
 Hayes, G., and K. D. Holl. 2003. Cattle grazing impacts on annual forbs and vegetation composition of mesic grasslands in California. Conservation Biology 17:1694 - 1702.
 Loveland, T. R., and H. L. Hutcheson. 1995. Monitoring Changes in Landscapes from Satellite Imagery. Pages 468-473 in U. S. G. Society, editor. Our Living Resources: A Report to the Nation on the Distribution, Abundance, and Health of U.S. Plants, Animals, and Ecosystems. U.S. Department of Interior, National Biological Service, Washington, D.C.
 Ornduff, Robert. (2003) Introduction to California Plant Life. Revised by Phyllis M. Faber and Todd Keeler-Wolf. University of California Press.
Plant Communities of Santa Cruz County, Santa Cruz Chapter, California Native Plant Society.
 Stromberg, M. R., P. Kephart, and V. Yadon. 2002. Composition, invasability, and diversity in coastal California grasslands. Madroño 48:236-252.

Notes

External links
CNGA: California Native Grasslands Association website
CNGA: Guide to Visiting California's Grasslands
CNGA: Bunchgrass species & habitats preservation & restoration

California chaparral and woodlands
Grasslands of California
Grasslands of Oregon
Plant communities of California
Temperate grasslands, savannas, and shrublands in the United States
Ecoregions of California

Prairie
Prairies